The Mountain Goats are an American, Durham, North Carolina-based band, led by American singer-songwriter John Darnielle. Darnielle began recording in 1991, and is known for his highly literate lyrics and (until 2002) his lo-fi recording style. The Mountain Goats' albums have featured a constantly changing line-up of musicians, with Darnielle the only constant; when performing live, the band commonly comprises only Darnielle backed by Peter Hughes on bass guitar and Jon Wurster playing drums. Their discography consists of 21 studio albums, four compilation albums, two live albums, ten demo albums, 18 solo extended plays, six collaborative extended plays, and 24 singles.

Albums

Studio albums

Live albums

Compilation albums

Demo albums

Extended plays

Split EPs

Singles

Other appearances

Unreleased

Notes

References

External links
 Discography on official site

 
Discographies of American artists